Antoine Philippon (born 10 October 1989) is a French professional footballer who plays as a goalkeeper for Championnat National 2 club GOAL FC.

Career
On 13 June 2019, it was confirmed that Philippon had joined Monts d'Or Azergues (renamed GOAL FC in 2020).

Notes

References

External links 
 Antoine Philippon profile at foot-national.com
 

1989 births
Living people
French footballers
Association football goalkeepers
AS Moulins players
ES Troyes AC players
US Créteil-Lusitanos players
CA Bastia players
FC Villefranche Beaujolais players
GOAL FC players
Ligue 2 players
Championnat National players
Championnat National 2 players
Sportspeople from Moulins, Allier
Footballers from Auvergne-Rhône-Alpes